Hooda Shawa Qaddumi (Arabic:هدى الشوا قدومي), a Palestinian–Kuwaiti writer of a Palestinian father and a British mother, was born in the United Kingdom. She had published children's and young adult's literature books. Her works won several awards, including the Sheikh Zayed Book Award for Children Literature for her book "The Birds’ Journey to Mount Qaf " in 2008.

Education and career 
Hooda Shawa Qaddumi grew up in the United Kingdom, and currently lives in Kuwait with her husband and their two children. She works as a professor of English at Kuwait University. Al Qaddumi studied at the American University in Cairo where she obtained a bachelor's degree in Economics and Political Science and then a master's of Education in Teaching English from The College of New Jersey in the US. Currently, she is obtaining a second master's degree in Comparative Literature and Cultural Studies from Kuwait University.

In 2008, her book "The Journey of Birds to Mount Qaf " won the Sheikh Zayed Book Award for Children's Literature. The Same book also won the Best Direction Book Award at the Beirut International Book Fair 50, and which is inspired by the poetic writing of the story "Logic of the Bird" by the Persian Sufi poet Farid al-Din al-Attar who lived in Nishapur during the twelfth century AD.

Works 

 "A Birds’ Journey to Mount Qaf" (original title: Rihlat Al Tuyoor ila Jabal Al Qaf), 2009
 “The Animal’s Vs the Humans at the Court of the King of the Jinn” (original title: Da’wa Al Hayawan Thid Al Insan Inda Malik Al Jann), 2012
 “The Yellow Man” (original title: Al Rajul Al Asfar)
 “The Secret Revealer” (original title: Kasheb Al Asrar), 2013
 “The Elephant’s Journey” (original title: Rihlat Al Feel), 2015
 “Apollo on Gaza Beach” (original title: Tneen Bait Laham), 2017

References 

21st-century Kuwaiti writers
Kuwaiti children's writers
Living people
The College of New Jersey alumni
Year of birth missing (living people)